The Campeonato Argentino de Rugby 2006  was won by the selection of the U.R.B.A. (Buenos Aires) that beat in the final the selection of Unión de Rugby de Tucumàn

The 23 teams participating were divided two levels : "Campeonato" (8 teams), "Ascenso", (15 teams, divided in two zone and five pools)

"Campeonato" 

The 8 teams divided in two pools of 4 teams. The first 2 to playoff.
The fourth of each pools to the  "finale descenso" (relegation final). The loser was relegated .

First phase 
Pool A

Pool B

Play-offs ("Title")

Pay Out ("Descenso")

Mar del Plata relegated (lost on aggregate 43-58)

"Ascenso" 
15 teams divided in two geografic zones:  "North" and "South". 
The final for promotion between the winner of each zone.

North Zone 
Three pools of 3 teams. The first of each pool and the better second to semifinals-

First Phase 
 POOL 1 

 POOL 2 

 POOL 3

Playoffs

South Zone 
Two pools of three teams. The winner of each Pool progressed to the zonal final.

POOL 1

POOL 2

ZONAL FINAL

"Ascenso" Final 

 Promoted : San Juan

External links 
  Memorias de la UAR 2006
  Francesco Volpe, Paolo Pacitti (Author), Rugby 2007, GTE Gruppo Editorale (2006)

Campeonato Argentino de Rugby
Argentina